Lorenzo Clemons (born November 13, 1946) is an American actor.

Biography
Clemons was born in Birmingham, Alabama.  He graduated from Northeastern Illinois University with a B.A. in Social Science in 1972.  From 1988-1994, Clemons was a football referee in the Big Ten Conference and he worked the 1991 Citrus Bowl and also the 1991 Liberty Bowl.

He currently lives in Chicago, Illinois with his wife, Debra, and his daughter, Shannon.

Filmography

References

External links

1946 births
Living people
Male actors from Alabama
American male film actors
American male television actors
Farragut Career Academy alumni
Northeastern Illinois University alumni
20th-century American male actors
21st-century American male actors